Ryan Smith may refer to:

Politicians
Ryan Smith (Australian politician) (born 1969), member for Warrandyte in the Victorian Legislative Assembly
Ryan Smith (Ohio politician) (born 1973), Republican member of the Ohio House of Representatives

Sports
Ryan Smith (cornerback, born 1985) (born 1985), American football player
Ryan Smith (cornerback, born 1993) (born 1993), American football player
Ryan Smith (wide receiver) (born 1991), Canadian football player
Ryan Smith (footballer) (born 1986), English footballer
Ryan Smith (rugby union, born 1979), Canadian rugby union player
Ryan Smith (rugby union, born 1996), Australian rugby union player
Ryan Smith (sports anchor), American sports anchor
Ryan Smith (baseball)

Music
Induce (musician)
Ryan Smith, vocalist in Mr Smith & The B Flat Band

Others
Ryan Smith (writer), writer for MADtv
Ryan Smith, author of the webcomic Funny Farm
Ryan Smith (businessman), co-founder of Qualtrics and owner of Utah Jazz
Ryan Smith (filmmaker)

See also
Ryan Smyth (born 1976), ice hockey player
Ryan Rowland-Smith (born 1983), Australian Major League Baseball pitcher